Richard Lane Allman (1813 – 22 December 1904) was an Irish businessman from Bandon in County Cork. He was also an Irish Liberal Party politician who sat in the House of Commons from 1880 to 1885. His brother was the botanist and natural history professor George Allman.

Early life
Allman was the son of James C. Allman and his wife Sarah née Lane.

The family were entrepreneurs in Bandon in the eighteenth and nineteenth centuries.
Initially they ran a cotton mill at Overton, near Bandon, but when this declined they established Bandon Distillery in 1826.

Business life
Allman's distillery produced up to 600,000 gallons of whiskey per year, which was mostly exported. However, trade was badly hit by prohibition in the United States and by the great depression.  Production stopped in 1925, and the business closed in 1929.

Parliament
At the general election in April 1880, Allman unsuccessfully contested the borough of Bandon.  He lost by 15 votes (175:200) to the Conservative Percy Broderick Bernard, a nephew of the 3rd Earl of Bandon whose family had held the seat for most of the 19th century.

However, Bernard resigned from the House of Commons in June 1880, and at the resulting by-election on 25 June 1880, Allman was elected as the Member of Parliament (MP) for Bandon. He had won 217 votes, against the 172 for the Conservative J. W. Payne.

The borough was disenfranchised at the 1885 general election.

References

External links 
 

1813 births
1904 deaths
People from Bandon, County Cork
Members of the Parliament of the United Kingdom for County Cork constituencies (1801–1922)
Irish Liberal Party MPs
UK MPs 1880–1885